Marr is a civil parish in the metropolitan borough of Doncaster, South Yorkshire, England.  The parish contains six listed buildings that are recorded in the National Heritage List for England.  Of these, one is listed at Grade I, the highest of the three grades, and the others are at Grade II, the lowest grade.  The parish contains the village of Marr and the surrounding area.  All the listed buildings are in the village, and consist of a church, a former manor house and associated structures, a farmhouse, and farm buildings.


Key

Buildings

References

Citations

Sources

 

Lists of listed buildings in South Yorkshire
Buildings and structures in the Metropolitan Borough of Doncaster